The Scarred People is the tenth studio album by Swedish gothic metal band Tiamat. The album was released on November 2, 2012 through Napalm Records in digital download, CD and limited edition vinyl formats.

Track listing
All tracks written and composed by Tiamat except "Born to Die" by Elizabeth Woolridge Grant and Justin Parker, and "Paradise" by Bruce Springsteen.
 The Scarred People - 6:38
 Winter Dawn - 4:13
 384 - 4:25
 Radiant Star - 3:45
 The Sun Also Rises - 5:06
 Before Another Wilbury Dies - 1:39
 Love Terrorists - 5:42
 Messinian Letter - 4:19
 Thunder & Lightning - 4:32
 Tiznit - 3:03
 Born to Die - 4:42 (limited edition bonus track)
 The Red of the Morning Sun - 4:21 (limited edition bonus track)
 Paradise - 5:28 (limited edition bonus track)
 Divided - 4:46 (limited edition live bonus track)
 Cain - 5:18 (limited edition live bonus track)

"Divided" and "Cain" recorded live at Z7, Pratteln, Switzerland, 6th of Dec. 2010.

Music videos
 The Scarred People produced by angst-im-wald.

Personnel
Tiamat
 Johan Edlund - guitar, keys, lead & backing vocals
 Roger Öjersson - lead guitar, keys, mandolin & backing vocals
 Anders Iwers - bass, lead vocals on "Paradise"
 Lars Sköld - drums
Additional personnel
 Siggi Bemm - additional keys, arranging & additional background vocals
 Gus G. - guitar solo on "Thunder & Lightning"
 Ioanna Lampropoulou - additional vocals
 Katerina Kladisiou - additional screams

Adiitional spoken words by playboys David Mortimer-Hawkins & Matt Korr.

Production
 Siggi Bemm - producer

References

External links
 Official Facebook

2012 albums
Tiamat (band) albums
Gothic rock albums by Swedish artists
Napalm Records albums